The following lists events that happened during 1852 in New Zealand.

Population
The estimated population of New Zealand at the end of 1852 is 63,100 Māori and 27,633 non-Māori.

Incumbents

Regal and viceregal
Head of State – Queen Victoria
Governor – Sir George Grey

Government and law
30 June: With the passing by the Parliament of the United Kingdom of New Zealand Constitution Act 1852 to grant the British colony self-government with a representative constitution the way is set for New Zealand’s first general election which will be held on 1 October 1853; the New Zealand Constitution Act 1846 is repealed.

Chief Justice — William Martin
Lieutenant Governor, New Munster — Edward John Eyre
Lieutenant Governor, New Ulster — Robert Henry Wynyard

Main centre leaders
Mayor of Auckland — Archibald Clark

Events 
At the second election for the Council of the Borough of Auckland insufficient councillors are elected and the Council ceases functioning.
19 January: The Governor Wynyard, the first steamer built in New Zealand, launched at Freemans Bay, Auckland, makes her first trial trip.
3 June: The Guardian and Canterbury Advertiser starts publication but ceases after less than four months, on 16 September.
4 August: The Taranaki Herald starts publication. It will move to daily publishing in 1877. From 1935 until 1989 (when it will cease publication) it will be New Zealand's oldest newspaper.

Births
 29 February: Ewen Alison, politician

Unknown date
 A. L. Beattie, locomotive engineer/designer (in Yorkshire)
 Peter Seton Hay, civil engineer and surveyor (in Scotland)

Deaths
 30 June: Susannah Noon, New South Wales convict who settled in New Zealand
 14 August: Michael Murphy, police magistrate
 25 September: William Henry Valpy, Dunedin pioneer settler
 26 October: Arthur Edward McDonogh, police magistrate

See also
List of years in New Zealand
Timeline of New Zealand history
History of New Zealand
Military history of New Zealand
Timeline of the New Zealand environment
Timeline of New Zealand's links with Antarctica

References